It Could Happen Tomorrow is a television series that premiered on January 15, 2006 on The Weather Channel. It explored the possibilities of various weather and other natural phenomena severely damaging or destroying America's cities. This included: a Category 3 hurricane hitting New York City, an F4 tornado destroying Washington, D.C., dormant volcano Mount Rainier re-activating and destroying towns in the surrounding valleys, a tsunami flooding the Pacific Northwest coast, an intraplate earthquake impacting Memphis, Tennessee,  wildfires spreading into the heart of San Diego, a huge earthquake leveling San Francisco, a flash flood in Boulder, Colorado, and a flood in Sacramento. Newer episodes that were aired included an earthquake in Las Vegas, an F5 tornado ripping its way through Chicago and Dallas, and more.

So far, the only scenario that has come true is the Colorado floods, which started on September 9, 2013. Because Hurricane Sandy was only a category 1 and not a 3 when New York was hit, the first episode technically hasn't come true ― yet, although Sandy was the closest call since the series was ended.

Plot
Each episode was broken into several segments: "It Did Happen", a segment that talked about similar disasters happening in other parts of America (or even earlier in the target city featured); "When It Happens/How It Would Happen", which talked about how the disaster would unfold; and a third segment about how to prepare for the disaster, and interviews with residents in the threatened areas about what they think of the disaster threat. Sometimes there is a segment called "Before It Happens", which shows what is being done to prepare for the disaster.

Production

"It Could Happen Tomorrow" was produced by Atlas Media Corporation. The program's executive producer was Bruce David Klein and supervising producer was Cheryl Houser.

Episode list

Season 1: 2006

†Hour long special, see Katrina episode section below

Season 2: 2007

Katrina episode

Coincidentally, the original Category 5 hurricane episode was to involve New Orleans. It was conceived and scripted months before Hurricane Katrina ever struck New Orleans. After Katrina, the debut episode was changed to instead show such a storm striking New York City (reducing the storm to a Category 3, as it is believed that is the strongest such storm that would strike the city; such a storm in 1938 missed New York City by just 75 miles, and historical records also show that a similar storm directly hit the city in 1821). On June 4, 2006 The Weather Channel aired this episode, titled "Katrina: The Lost Episode." Unlike most episodes, this episode was one hour in length and combined clips of the "lost" episode with a Storm Stories-style retelling of Katrina's effects.

Schedule

It Could Happen Tomorrow continued running on TWC until April 2010, when The Weather Channel began airing many other new weather shows; it was replaced by Storm Stories and Full Force Nature. On March 12, 2011, It Could Happen Tomorrow was brought back to the schedule. As of July 2013, two episodes aired Fridays at 4–5 pm, but as of October 2013, it is no longer on TWC's schedule.

See also
Perfect Disaster - a similar television show
Mega Disasters - another worst-case scenario series on History Channel

References

The Weather Channel original programming
Documentary films about disasters
2006 American television series debuts
2007 American television series endings
2000s American documentary television series
English-language television shows